Fetish fashion is any style or appearance in the form of a
type of clothing or accessory, created to be extreme or provocative in a fetishistic manner. These styles are by definition not worn by the majority of people; if everyone wears an item, it cannot have fetishistic, special nature. They are usually made of materials such as leather, latex or synthetic rubber or plastic, nylon, PVC, spandex, fishnet, and stainless steel. Some fetish fashion items include: stiletto heel shoes and boots (most notably the ballet boot), hobble skirts, corsets, collars, full-body latex catsuits, stockings, miniskirt, crotchless underwear, jockstraps, diapers, garters, locks, rings, zippers, eyewear, handcuffs, and stylized costumes based on more traditional outfits, such as wedding dresses that are almost completely see-through lace, or lingerie for men.

Fetish fashions should not be confused with costuming. They both involve clothing and intend to present an image, but a costume is by definition something for public view, without sexual implications. Fetish fashion is usually for an intimate setting, with sexual implications.

Fetish fashions are usually considered to be separate from those clothing items used in cosplay, whereby these exotic fashions are specifically used as costuming to effect a certain situation rather than to be merely worn; such as the creation of a character for picture play. However, sometimes the two areas do overlap. For example, in Japan, many themed restaurants have waitresses who wear costumes such as a suit made of latex or a stylized French maid outfit.

Fetish fashion clothing is often modelled by specialist fetish models.

Some type of garments that women wear to routinely improve their appearance are thought of as erotic and qualify as fetish wear: corsets and high heels. Most fetish wear is not practical enough for routine daily wear. An example of a fetish costume worn by women is the dominatrix costume. This typically consists of dark or black garments including a corset or bustier, stockings and high-heeled footwear such as thigh-high boots to enhance the dominating appearance. An accessory such as a whip or a riding crop is often carried.

History
Fetish fashion has no specific origin point because certain fashions that were appreciated specifically for themselves or worn as part of a specific subculture have been noted since the earliest days of clothing. Some scholars, like Michael Hayworth, argue that the use of corsetry and hobble skirts back in the late 19th century was the first mainstream note of fetish fashions, because the majority of society did not have access to these articles. These items were specifically appreciated for themselves (i.e. the person liked the woman wearing the corset rather than just the woman by herself).

In 1914 a few weeks before the start of World War One, L. Richard and his wife Nativa founded their lingerie firm, Yva Richard, in Paris. Their custom made unique creations became increasingly daring and avant-garde, and by the late 1920s, they had highly successful international mail-order business. Richard took most of the photographs for their catalogue, and Nativa would sometimes model. One of their most iconic designs was a studded steel cone bra and chastity belt with a plumed headdress. Their success encouraged the tailor Léon Vidal, who owned a chain of erotic bookshops to open a luxurious lingerie boutique called Diana Slip.

A leather subculture appeared amongst the underground gay community in the United States, with the first gay leather bar opening in 1958 in Chicago. This culture quickly spread worldwide, and became more mainstream in the 1960s due to the influence of rock musicians and television performers such as Diana Rigg and Honor Blackman in The Avengers, who wore full body leather catsuits and full limb-covering leather and latex gloves and boots.

Many fashion designers incorporate elements of the fetish subculture into their creations or directly create products based on elements that are not accepted by the mainstream. Malcolm McLaren and Vivienne Westwood created several restrictive BDSM-inspired clothing items of punk fashion for the 1970s punk subculture; in particular bondage trousers, which connect the wearer's legs with straps. The more recent fetish clothing makers House of Harlot and Torture Garden Clothing, Breathless of London, Vex Latex Clothing and Madame S of California focus on using latex and leather as the base material for their creations, rather than as an accessory.

Publications
Fetish fashions became popularized in the United States during the 1950s through books and magazines such as Bizarre and many other underground publications. Skin Two is a contemporary fetish magazine covering many aspects of the worldwide fetish subculture. The name is a reference to fetish clothing as a second skin.

Mainstream 

Fetish fashion has had an influence on mainstream fashion, both on and off the runway. Many well-known designers have used fetish wear as an inspiration, borrowing details and incorporating materials such as latex, PVC, lace, vinyl and patent leather. Such designers include Thierry Mugler, Jonathan Saunders, Alexander McQueen, Christian Dior, Chanel and Nicholas Kirkwood. The Alexander McQueen Autumn/Winter 2016 ready-to-wear collection was influenced by fetish fashion, and the inspiration of materials and pieces such as harnesses and corsets can be seen on most of the looks.

Other brands have been created specifically for the fetish clothing luxury market. Zana Bayne, a post-fetish leather brand based in New York City was founded by Zana Bayne in 2010. Their work has been worn by celebrities such as Beyoncé and Lady Gaga. Zana Bayne have also collaborated with other brands such as Marc Jacobs and Comme des Garçons. Todd Pendu began working with Zana Bayne when he was at Comme des Garçons, before becoming a full-time creative partner at Zana Bayne in 2012. Atsuko Kudo is another brand explicitly influenced by fetish fashion, who design and manufacture ladies wear made entirely in latex rubber.

Street fashion has also been influenced by fetish fashion. By late 2016 and through 2017 a number of fetish fashion elements had appeared in ready-to-wear and street wear around the world. This includes items such as chokers, fishnets, corsets, thigh-high boots; details such as straps, buckles, pierced ring hardware and chains; and materials like patent leather and vinyl.

See also

 Charles Guyette
 Clothing fetish
 Eric Stanton
 Fetish magazine
 Gene Bilbrew
 Going commando
 Gothic fashion
 Industrial fashion
 Leather subculture
 Irving Klaw
 John Willie
 Kink (sexuality)
 Sexual fetishism

Dance Culture
 Body art
 Clubbing

Clothing
 Edible underwear
 PVC clothing
 Rubber and PVC fetishism
 Spandex fetishism
 Underwear as outerwear
 Uniform fetishism

References

External link

History of fashion